Cheboksary International Airport (Shupashkar Aeroporchĕ)  is a small airport located  southeast of Cheboksary, a city in Chuvashia, Russia.  It services medium-sized airliners. In 2018, the number of passengers passing through this airport reached 270,000 passengers.

Airlines and destinations

References

External links

Official site 
Unofficial site 

Airports built in the Soviet Union
Airports in Chuvashia